Viktor Andreyev (born 24 May 1974) is a Russian swimmer. He competed in the men's 1,500 metre freestyle event at the 1992 Summer Olympics.

References

External links
 

1974 births
Living people
Russian male swimmers
Olympic swimmers of the Unified Team
Swimmers at the 1992 Summer Olympics
Place of birth missing (living people)
Russian male freestyle swimmers
20th-century Russian people
21st-century Russian people